TuxGuitar is a free and open-source tablature editor, which includes features such as tablature editing, score editing, and import and export of Guitar Pro gp3, gp4, and gp5 files. In addition, TuxGuitar's tablature and staff interfaces function as basic MIDI editors.

TuxGuitar's mascot and namesake is Tux, the penguin mascot of many games and programs originally designed for Linux.

The program is written in the Java programming language and is released under the LGPL-2.1-only license.

Skins 
TuxGuitar offers a set of three default skins that its users can choose from.  These are:

TuxGuitar also supports custom skins. The default skin for version 1.0 is Lavender.

Supported effects

Supported file formats

Reception 
, TuxGuitar had 4/5 stars in the CNET user ratings. During the same time, TuxGuitar had 3.4/5 stars in the Softpedia user ratings.  the program has 4.7/5 stars on SourceForge. Reviewers at Software Informer gave version 1.0 of TuxGuitar 5/5 stars, praising the "very easy to use interface" and "very advanced functions" of the program.

See also
 List of music software

References 

Guitar-related software
Java platform software
Cross-platform software
Scorewriters
Free music software
Audio software that uses GTK
Scorewriters for Linux